Yuvalar is a village in the Sason District, Batman Province, Turkey. The village is populated by Arabs and had a population of 314 in 2021.

The hamlets of Sarıkız and Üçdilek are attached to the village.

References

Villages in Sason District

Arab settlements in Batman Province